Lesley Judith Cantwell (22 February 1987 – 7 June 2013) was a New Zealand racewalker. Cantwell won the gold medal in the women's 5000 m road walk at the 2013 Oceania Athletics Championships in Tahiti on 4 June 2013. While waiting for the medal ceremony, she felt unwell and collapsed. She was taken to a local hospital where she died three days later.

She died on 7 June 2013, aged 26, from a suspected subarachnoid hemorrhage.

References

External links
New Zealand Race Walker Passes Away article at the OAA website

1987 births
2013 deaths
New Zealand female racewalkers
People from Te Anau
Deaths from subarachnoid hemorrhage
Neurological disease deaths in France
Disease-related deaths in French Polynesia
Sport deaths in France